Edward Flowerdew (died 1586), was an English judge and MP.

Life
Flowerdew, fourth son of John Flowerdew of Hethersett, Norfolk, a large landed proprietor, was educated at Cambridge, but took no degree. He became a member of the Inner Temple 11 October 1552, and in the autumn of 1569 and Lent of 1577 was reader, and in 1579 treasurer. He obtained considerable celebrity as a lawyer in his own county.

In 1571 he became counsel to the dean and chapter of Norwich, and in 1573 to the town of Great Yarmouth. He was counsel also to Sir Thomas Gresham. The town of Norwich gave him a silver cup in 1571, presumably for professional services, and various grateful clients settled annuities on him, Thomas Grimesdiche settling 40s. and John Thornton 26s. 8d. in 1573, and Simon Harcourt of Stanton Harcourt, Oxfordshire, one third of five marks in 1575.

On 12 February 1584 he received a grant from the clerk of the royal kitchen of a buck in summer and a doe in winter yearly from any royal forest in Norfolk or elsewhere. He was elected M.P. for Castle Rising in 1572, but replaced by Sir William Drury in 1581 when he reported sick. He was then returned as MP for Norwich in 1581 when their MP fell sick. The replacements were later ruled inadmissible and invalid. He became a serjeant-at-law and recorder of Great Yarmouth, 16 October 1580, and on 23 October 1584 third baron of the exchequer, when he resigned his recordership.

On 20 February 1585 he was a member of the special commission for the county of Middlesex, before which Dr William Parry was tried and convicted for high treason. In the winter of 1585 and 1586 he went on circuit in South Wales, and in March held the notorious Lent Black Assize of Exeter from 14 March 1586. Here gaol fever broke out from which he, together with many others, died between 14 March and 4 April. He was buried at Hethersett Church.

He was a man of grasping temper, but apparently not of fine feelings. In 1564 he purchased Stanfield Hall and its furniture from John Appleyard, in order to live there, and also married Elizabeth, daughter of William Foster of Wymondham, who had long been Appleyard's mistress. In 1575 he acquired the site of the dissolved abbey of Wymondham. The parishioners, wishing to preserve the church, petitioned the crown to be allowed to buy it at a valuation, and paid the money. Flowerdew, however, stripped it of its lead and carried off a quantity of freestone, whereupon the exasperated parishioners dismantled it. His lands were dispersed on his death, and he left no issue. According, however, to another account, he had a daughter, who married Thomas Skelton.

Family 
Edward Flowerdew was fourth son of John Flowerdew of Hethersett, Norfolk, by Catherine, daughter of William Sheres of Ashwellthorpe. Edward Flowerdew had a brother, William Flowerdew, who married Frances Appleyard, the half-sister of Amy Robsart, first wife of Robert Dudley. Through William and Frances's son, Anthony Flowerdew of Hethersett in Norfolk who married Martha Stanley of Scottow in Norfolk, Edward Flowerdew is the great-uncle of Temperance Flowerdew, Stanley Flowerdew and Mary Flowerdew, who married Dionysis Rossingham and had Ensign Edmund Rossingham, one of the representatives from the Flowerdew Hundred sent to the first General Assembly in Jamestown in 1619.

References

History of Parliament online - FLOWERDEW, Edward (c.1534-86) of Hethersett and Stanfield Hall, Norf.

Year of birth missing
1586 deaths
People from Hethersett
Alumni of the University of Cambridge
Members of the Inner Temple
English MPs 1572–1583
Serjeants-at-law (England)
16th-century English judges